Epiphany is the first studio album by Smooth jazz artist Ian Villafana, released in 2010.

Track listing
 "Asil"
 "Klueless"
 "Tavion"
 "Caribbean Lights"
 "Epiphany"
 "Lovers Come, Lovers Go"
 "Sunday Morning Love"
 "Lazy in Love"

Personnel
 Steel Acoustic/Nylon Acoustic guitar: Ian Villafana
 Electric guitar: Ian Villafana
 Vocals: Jada B, Quintin Gerard W.
 Bass guitar: Larry Allen, Ian Villafana
 Production/Programming: Quintin Gerard W.
 Electric piano: Eric Nicholas
 Additional piano/keyboard: Quintin Gerard W.

References

2010 albums